Witek is a surname. Notable people with the surname include:

 Elżbieta Witek (born 1957), Polish politician
 Frank P. Witek (1921–1944), United States Marine 
 Kate Witek, American politician
 Melissa Witek (born 1981), American actress, model and beauty queen
 Mickey Witek (1915–1990), American professional baseball player
 Terri Witek, American poet